Arno Wohlfahrter (27 November 1964) is an Austrian former cyclist. He won the Austrian National Road Race Championships in 1987.

References

External links
 

1964 births
Living people
Austrian male cyclists
Sportspeople from Klagenfurt
20th-century Austrian people